Hupp is a surname. Notable people with the surname include:

Anne Hupp (1757–1823), American frontierswoman
Bobby Hupp (1877–1931), American automobile engineer and company founder
Harry Lindley Hupp (1929-2004), American judge
Jana Marie Hupp (born 1964), American actress
Otto Hupp (1859–1949), German graphical artist
Pam Hupp (born 1957/1958), American woman charged with murder
Suzanna Hupp (born 1959), American politician